Gregor Hildebrandt (born 1974 in Bad Homburg, West Germany) is a German contemporary artist who lives and works in Berlin, Germany

Early life and education 
Gregor Hildebrandt graduated from Hochschule der Künste, Berlin in 2002, after he studied previously at the University of Mainz between 1995-1999. Hildebrandt was awarded a Studienstiftung scholarship between 1998-2002 and received a scholarship at the Deutsches Studienzentrum in Venice the following year, while still a student. Today, he lives in Berlin with fellow artist Alicja Kwade.

Work 
In his artistic practice, Gregor Hildebrandt makes extensive use of pre-recorded cassette tapes as material in his pictures and installations. The tapes are applied directly onto canvases and photographic prints and in room-sized installations. In his paintings, he adheres the coated side of cassette tapes onto a canvas, presses on it with a brush or roller, and rips the tape off to create the defined, yet sporadic lines on his works. He repeats the process before finally gluing them onto the canvas for good to create what he calls the “negative” painting. For sculptures, he shapes vinyl records into bowls, sometimes stacking them to create what the artist calls a “sonic wall made of pillars of records.”

Hildebrandt started thinking about incorporating audio into his practice during his time at the University of the Arts in Berlin. In the late 1990s, the artist recorded 'Falschgeld' by German experimental group Einstürzende Neubauten before cutting the magnetic tape out and pasting it into his sketchbook. Hildebrandt's signature canvases known for its magnetic tape covering were developed in the 2000s, gradually increasing in size to take on architectural dimensions. The 2021 large-scale installation Hirnholzparkett (2015), shown at G2 Kunsthalle in Leipzig, incorporated 35,000 audiocassette tapes into record-sized reels, cast into epoxy resin and layered across the floor. 

Although Hildebrandt’s work makes formal reference to Minimalism, the addition of a great number of subjective and autobiographical citations actually deliberately repudiates this strategy. For Hildebrandt, the cassette tape as artistic medium, especially in its original function of storage medium, fulfils an important function: it enables the artist to add a further “invisible” dimension to his pictures. Playing with perception in this way is a major characteristic of his work; the picture is completed in the head of the viewer. 
 
If the contemplation of his art incorporates the heterogeneous cosmos of Gregor Hildebrandt’s references to music, film, literature and, last but not least, art history, his works turn out to be complex montages, in which pictorial associations from different spheres combine and interpenetrate. Hildebrandt employs the material of his every-day environment without aesthetic or theoretical inhibition and playfully links aspects of conceptual art and minimal art with his personal life and experience of pop culture. 

Gregor Hildebrandt is represented by Wentrup in Berlin, Grimm Gallery in Amsterdam, Almine Rech Gallery in Paris, Brussels and London and Emmanuel Perrotin in New York. and Casado Santapau gallery at Madrid.

Selected solo exhibitions
2012
 Nächtliches Konzert, Museum Van Bommel van Dam with Jorinde Voigt, Venlo, Netherlands 
 Eind Koffer aus Berlin, Saarländisches Künstlerhaus, Saarbrücken
 Schlaf is Zeit, die dir gehört, AVLSKARL, Copenhagen

2011
 FÜR KOMMENDE MORGEN, Wentrup, Berlin 
 Seiten im Buch wie Wände im Raum, Almine Rech Gallery, Paris 
 Und dass zu frühe die Parze den Traum nicht ende, Grimm Gallery, Amsterdam

2010
 vor der Tür stehen weiße Pferde, Galerie Almine Rech, Brussels
 die Nacht trägt den Plan, Van Horn, Düsseldorf
 Shapeless in the Dark again, Sommer Contemporary, Tel Aviv

2009
 Weiße Nacht hängt an den Bergen, GriederContemporary, Zurich
 Daß dieser Mai nie ende, Wentrup, Berlin
 Der Himmel im Raum, Berlinische Galerie, Berlin (cat.)

2008
 This was made to end all parties, Ursula Werz, Tübingen
 Front Room, Contemporary Art Museum St. Louis, St. Louis
 Hokuspokus, Kunstverein Schwerte, Schwerte
 Statement, Art 39 Basel (with Galerie Jan Wentrup)
 und im Garten blüht ein Blumenbeet, Haus am Waldsee, Berlin

2007
 Dunkle Fahrt zu hellem Tag, Kunstverein Ludwigshafen
 Dunkle Fahrt zu hellem Tag, Galerie Jan Wentrup, Berlin
 Zum Wohl der Tränen, Almine Rech Gallery, Paris

2006
 B:1F-134, Uberbau, Düsseldorf with Alicja Kwade

2005
 Von den Steinen zu den Sternen, Galerie Jan Wentrup, Berlin
 Tage und Stunden zerspringen vor Glück, Städtische Galerie Pankow, Berlin

2004
 allnightlong, Kaiserpassage 21a, Karlsruhe (with Jenny Rosemeyer)
 Und dieses Wasser wird sich immer schwarz färben, Arsenal HKM1, Raum für Kunst, Mainz

2003
 Dunst blauer Tage, Kunstverein Eislingen (cat.)
 Hausmusik, Mt. Warning, Berlin
 Black Flags under the Yellow Moon, Hinterconti, Hamburg (with Carola Deye)

2002
 Tönende Jugend, WBD, Berlin

Public collections 
 Centre Pompidou / Paris, F
 Berlinische Galerie / Berlin, D
 Sammlung zeitgenössische Kunst des Bundes, D
 Sammlung Museum van Bommel van Dam/ Venlo, NL

Selected notable private collections 
 Martin Z. Margulies Collection / Miami, US
 Rubell Family Collection, US
 Collection Jill & Peter Kraus /New York, US
 Pat and Juan Vergez Collection/ Buenos Aires, AR
 Sammlung Südhausbau / München, D
 Collection Robert and Renée Drake / Wassenaar, NL
 Sammlung Philara /Düsseldorf, D
 sammlung FIEDE /Aschaffenburg, D
 Collection Steve and Chiara Rosenblum / Paris, F
 Burger Collection / Zürich / Hong Kong, CH / HK

Awards and scholarships
 2008 - Vattenfall Kunstpreis „Energie“
 2008 - Stiftung Kunstfonds 
 2005 / 2006 - Scholarship, DAAD, Vienna
 2004 - Award, GASAG
 2003 - Scholarship, Deutsches Studienzentrum Venedig
 1998 / 2002 - Scholarship, Studienstiftung des deutschen Volkes

Bibliography

 Gregor Hildebrandt: Tönend hallt die Jugend, Kunsthalle Recklinghausen, DE/EN,

References

External links
 Gregor Hildenbrandt Artist Page at Sommer Contemporary Art Gallery Website

1974 births
Living people
German artists
German contemporary artists